Skeat or Skeats is a common English family name. The names Skeat, Skeats, Skeates, Skett, Skitt and Skates are derived from the forename Scet or Schett, which is mentioned in Domesday Book.

History
Skeat was originally a given name derived from the Old Norse skjótr, meaning "swift" or "fleet". Ricardus filius (son of) Schet 1166 is mentioned in the Pipe Rolls of Henry II in Norfolk. It is mentioned as a surname in the 1201 Pipe Rolls in Shropshire and in the 1275 Hundred Rolls in Norfolk again. Robert Skeet is mentioned in the Subsidy Rolls of Suffolk for 1327.

People surnamed Skeat or Skeats

 Bob Skeat, bass guitarist in Wishbone Ash
 Ethel Skeat (1865–1939), English paleontologist
 Ernest Willington Skeats (1875–1953), geologist
 Francis Skeat (1909–2000), English glass painter
 Len Skeat, jazz double-bassist
 Theodore Cressy Skeat (1907–2003), paleographer
 Walter William Skeat (1835–1912), philologist and etymologist
 Walter William Skeat (anthropologist) (1866–1953), anthropologist

References